Ghuraba    was a Palestinian Arab village in the Safad Subdistrict. It was depopulated during the 1948 War on May 28, 1948, by the Palmach's First Battalion of Operation Yiftach. It was located 22 km northeast of Safad.

In 1945 it had a population of 220 Muslims.

History

British mandate era
In the 1931 census of Palestine, during the  British Mandate for Palestine,  the village had a population of 124  Muslims, in a total of 27 houses.

By the  1945 statistics the population was  220 Muslims, with a total of 2,933 dunams of land, according to an official land and population survey.  Of this, Arabs used  2,928  dunams for  plantations and irrigable land, while a total of 47 dunams was non-cultivable area.

1948, aftermath
After fighting broke out nearby on 1 May, 1948, many villagers fled. By late June, the  Haganah Intelligence reported that there were "concentrations of Arab refugees" in Ghuraba.

In 1951 Gonen was established on Ghurabah land.

In 1992 the village site was described: "The stones of ruined houses are strewn across the fenced-in site. Segments of a few stone walls still stand. The site and the surrounding land are used for grazing."

References

Bibliography

External links
 Welcome To Ghuraba
Ghuraba, Zochrot
  Ghuraba, Villages of Palestine
Survey of Western Palestine, Map 4: IAA, Wikimedia commons

Arab villages depopulated during the 1948 Arab–Israeli War
District of Safad